Ramón Puello (born 25 August 1946) is a Dominican Republic boxer. He competed in the men's lightweight event at the 1968 Summer Olympics. At the 1968 Summer Olympics, he lost to Armando Mendoza of Venezuela.

References

1946 births
Living people
Dominican Republic male boxers
Olympic boxers of the Dominican Republic
Boxers at the 1968 Summer Olympics
Sportspeople from Santo Domingo
Lightweight boxers